Acla was a Spanish colonial town of the early 16th century.

ACLA is an acronym that may refer to:

Anti-cardiolipin antibodies
Allegheny County Library Association, a library association in Western Pennsylvania
American Coalition of Life Activists, an anti-abortion activist group that was the subject of controversy for its series of Wanted-style posters
American Comparative Literature Association, a learned society in the US
All China Lawyers Association, the Bar association of the People's Republic of China
Aero Consult Light Aircraft, an aircraft manufacturer in the Netherlands